Utpal Dholakia is an Indian American researcher and professor. He is the George R. Brown Professor of Marketing at the Jones Graduate School of Business, Rice University, and the founder of marketing insights consultancy, Empyrean Insights.

Dholakia's research concerns the general area of consumer motivation and the substantive/practice area of marketing research, digital marketing, and social media. Some of his research also deals with financial decision making by consumers and investors. He has published over 150 articles in scientific journals. He is the author of two books entitled How to Price Effectively: A Guide for Managers and Entrepreneurs (2017) and Priced to Influence, Sell & Satisfy: Lessons from Behavioral Economics for Pricing Success (2019). He writes a blog on Psychology Today entitled The Science Behind Behavior.

Early life and education 
Dholakia was born and raised in Bombay, India. After completing a BE in Industrial Engineering from the Victoria Jubilee Technical Institute in 1993, he received the J. N. Tata Endowment Scholarship for Outstanding Undergraduate Work, which he used to study at Ohio State University. In 1994, he received an MS in Industrial Engineering from Ohio State University. He received an MS in Cognitive Psychology in 1997, followed by a Ph.D. in marketing in 1998, both from the University of Michigan.

Career 
After completing his Ph.D., Dholakia joined M&T Bank as a Research Director and worked there until 2000 when he left to join University at Buffalo as an Assistant Professor of Marketing. He left University at Buffalo in 2001 and joined Rice University as Assistant Professor of Management, becoming Associate Professor in 2006. In 2007, he was endowed with the Jones School Distinguished Associate Professorship at Rice University and in 2008, the William S. Mackay, Jr. and Verne F. Simons Distinguished Associate Professorship. He became a Full Professor at Rice University in 2011 and in 2015, he was awarded the George R. Brown Chair of Marketing.

Dholakia has been on the Editorial Boards of Journal of Marketing since 2018, the Journal of Public Policy and Marketing since 2016, the Journal of Retailing since 2011, and the Journal of Interactive Marketing since 2008. He has also served on the Editorial Boards of Journal of Behavioral Decision Making, Journal of Consumer Psychology, Journal of Marketing Research, Journal of Service Research, and Psychology & Marketing. From 2015 to 2017, he was an Associate Editor for Journal of Service Research.

In 2000, Dholakia founded Empyrean Insights, a marketing research, and consultancy firm. He has been a consultant to many companies in financial services, healthcare, technology, and energy industries. He has briefly taught at the London Business School, Korea University Business School, Renmin University of China, and the University of Zurich.

Research 
Dholakia's research concerns the general area of consumer motivation and the substantive/practice area of marketing issues related to the internet and social media and pricing. In the late 1990s and 2000s, his research focused on the topics of goal setting and goal striving, motivated decision making, impulsive choices and self-control, and intentional social action and social influence. His work also studied the adoption of the Internet by consumers and businesses.

In the early 2010s, Dholakia's research focus shifted to the substantive area of financial decision making by consumers using motivation and decision making lenses. During the same time, he also got involved in research involving marketing strategy and activities for startups and small and medium-sized businesses.

Consumer motivation and Internet marketing 
In the 1990s and early 2000s, Dholakia's primary research focus was in the areas of consumer motivation and Internet marketing. A part of his dissertation was published as a review paper titled 'Goal Setting and Goal Striving in Consumer Behavior' in the Journal of Marketing.

In this area, Dholakia also conducted research on the mere measurement effect, on online social interactions, on perception, on impulsive choices and the social influence of brand community. His work on mere measurement effect shows that when customers are surveyed about their satisfaction, they behave more relationally towards the company conducting the survey. These effects are profitable and last even a year later. One of his papers on online social interactions entitled 'Intentional Social Action in Virtual Communities' published in the Journal of Interactive Marketing won the inaugural award for the best paper published in the journal in 2002. In 2004, he published 'A Social Influence Model of Consumer Participation in Network - and Small-Group-Based Virtual Communities' in the International Journal of Research in Marketing, which became one of his most cited papers.

Financial decision making 
Since 2010, Dholakia has also researched financial decision making by consumers. His papers study the role of psychological factors in getting people to save more money. In a 2011 paper titled 'Delay and Duration Effects of Time Frames on Personal Savings Estimates and Behavior', with Leona Tam, Dholakia discovered that estimates of personal savings are sensitive to both duration (length of time for which they are made) and time-frame (how far into the future they are made). In a 2014 Psychological Science paper, 'Saving in Cycles: How to Get People to Save More Money', Tam and Dholakia discovered a method based on circular time orientation that is common in Asian cultures, that consumers can use to save more money. In a 2016 paper titled 'The Ant and the Grasshopper: Understanding Personal Saving Orientation of Consumers', Dholakia created a saving scale called 'Personal Saving Orientation' scale to measure affinity of consumers to save money consistently and incorporate saving behavior into their lifestyles.

In the media 
Dholakia's research has been covered extensively in the media. He conducted numerous studies of Groupon and other daily-deal promotions during 2010–2014, studying the pros and cons of running these promotions on the financial performance of small businesses. These studies received considerable media attention, including Harvard Business Review, Forbes, The Economist, Inc. magazine, The Atlantic, MIT Technology Review, The Telegraph, and the Houston Chronicle. During 2016–2019, Dholakia's work on pricing issues for businesses and their implications for consumer welfare have been widely covered by the media including the Atlantic, Fox Business News, Money, the Los Angeles Times, USA Today and The Wall Street Journal. He writes a blog on Psychology Today entitled The Science Behind Behavior.

Awards and honors 
1996 - Thomas William Leabo Award for outstanding doctoral work, Michigan Business School
1997 - Doctoral Internationalization Consortium Fellow, University of Texas
1997 - AMA Doctoral Consortium Fellow, University of Cincinnati
1998 - Milton & Josephine Kendrick Award in Marketing for outstanding doctoral work, Michigan Business School
2003 - Best paper award, Journal of Interactive Marketing
2006 - Best paper award, Association of University Professors of Management
2009 - Park award for best paper, Journal of Consumer Psychology
2013 - Best paper award, Center for Positive Organizational Scholarship, University of Michigan
2015 - Steenkamp award for long-term impact

Selected publications

Books 
How to Price Effectively: A Guide for Managers and Entrepreneurs (2017)
Priced to Influence, Sell & Satisfy: Lessons from Behavioral Economics for Pricing Success (2019)

Articles 
Bagozzi, R. P., & Dholakia, U. (1999). Goal setting and goal striving in consumer behavior. Journal of Marketing, 63(4_suppl1), 19–32.
Dholakia, U. M., & Morwitz, V. G. (2002). The scope and persistence of mere-measurement effects: Evidence from a field study of customer satisfaction measurement. Journal of Consumer Research, 29(2), 159–167.
Algesheimer, R., Dholakia, U. M., & Herrmann, A. (2005). The social influence of brand community: Evidence from European car clubs. Journal of Marketing, 69(3), 19–34.
Dholakia, U. M., & Simonson, I. (2005). The effect of explicit reference points on consumer choice and online bidding behavior. Marketing Science, 24(2), 206–217.
Dholakia, U. M. (2006). How customer self-determination influences relational marketing outcomes: evidence from longitudinal field studies. Journal of Marketing Research, 43(1), 109–120.
Borle, S., Dholakia, U. M., Singh, S. S., & Westbrook, R. A. (2007). The impact of survey participation on subsequent customer behavior: An empirical investigation. Marketing Science, 26(5), 711–726. 
Algesheimer, R., Borle, S., Dholakia, U. M., & Singh, S. S. (2010). The impact of customer community participation on customer behaviors: An empirical investigation. Marketing Science, 29(4), 756–769.
Herzenstein, M., Sonenshein, S., & Dholakia, U. M. (2011). Tell me a good story and I may lend you money: The role of narratives in peer-to-peer lending decisions. Journal of Marketing Research, 48(SPL), S138-S149.
Tam, L., & Dholakia, U. (2014). Saving in cycles: How to get people to save more money. Psychological Science, 25(2), 531–537.
Dholakia, U., Tam, L., Yoon, S., & Wong, N. (2016). The ant and the grasshopper: understanding personal saving orientation of consumers. Journal of Consumer Research, 43(1), 134–155.

References 

Rice University faculty
Ohio State University College of Engineering alumni
Ross School of Business alumni
Living people
Indian American
Year of birth missing (living people)
University at Buffalo faculty